Manodara Acharige Don Dilani Surangika (born 8 December 1982), known as Dilani Manodara, is a Sri Lankan cricketer who has played in 139 international matches. She holds the record for effecting the most dismissals as wicket-keeper for Sri Lanka in Women's ODIs with 67. Manodara was member of the 2014 Asian Games bronze medal winning team.

In October 2018, she was named in Sri Lanka's squad for the 2018 ICC Women's World Twenty20 tournament in the West Indies. In January 2020, she was named in Sri Lanka's squad for the 2020 ICC Women's T20 World Cup in Australia.

References

1982 births
Living people
Asian Games medalists in cricket
Cricketers at the 2014 Asian Games
Cricketers from Kandy
Sri Lankan women cricketers
Sri Lanka women One Day International cricketers
Sri Lanka women Twenty20 International cricketers
Sri Lanka women cricket captains
Asian Games bronze medalists for Sri Lanka
Medalists at the 2014 Asian Games